Mitsumatsu Station may refer to:
 Mitsumatsu Station (Fukui), a railway station in Fukui Prefecture, Japan
 Mitsumatsu Station (Osaka), a railway station in Osaka Prefecture, Japan